Publius Cornelius Lentulus Sura (114 BC – 5 December 63 BC) was one of the chief figures in the Catilinarian conspiracy. He was also the step-father of the future triumvir Mark Antony.

Biography
When accused by Sulla (to whom he had been quaestor in 81 BC) of having squandered the public money, he refused to render any account, but insolently held out the calf of his leg (sura), on which part of the person boys were punished when they made mistakes in playing ball, akin to inviting a slap on the wrist. He was praetor in 75 BC, governor of Sicily in 74 BC, and consul in 71 BC.

In 70, he was one of a number of senators expelled from the senate for immorality (he was later readmitted at an unknown date). In 63, soon after his election to praetor, he joined Catiline. Relying upon a Sibylline oracle that three Cornelii should be rulers of Rome, Lentulus regarded himself as the destined successor of Lucius Cornelius Sulla and Lucius Cornelius Cinna. When Catiline left Rome after Cicero's second speech In Catilinam, Lentulus took his place as chief of the conspirators in the city. In conjunction with C. Cornelius Cethegus, he undertook to murder Cicero and set fire to Rome, but the plot failed owing to his timidity and indiscretion.

On learning that ambassadors from the Allobroges were in Rome bearing a complaint against their oppression by Roman provincial governors, Lentulus made overtures to them with the object of obtaining armed assistance. Pretending to fall in with his views, the ambassadors obtained a written agreement signed by the chief conspirators, and informed Q. Fabius Sanga, their "patron" in Rome, who in turn informed Cicero.

The conspirators were arrested and forced to admit their guilt. Lentulus was compelled to abdicate his praetorship, and, as it was feared that there might be an attempt to rescue him, he was put to death in the Tullianum on 5 December 63 BC, along with other senatorial supporters of Catiline.

The legitimacy of these killings, which were carried out on the personal command of the consuls and without a judicial trial, was disputed. Cicero argued that his actions were lawful under the Senatus consultum ultimum, but was exiled in 58 BC after the people's tribune, Publius Clodius Pulcher, Cicero's bitter enemy, passed a law prohibiting extrajudicial killings of Roman citizens, and then accused Cicero of having violated it. This is an example of an ex post facto law. He was recalled the following year, though, by a vote of the senate.

Cicero had cause to regret his actions, as his treatment of Lentulus was one of the reasons why Mark Antony, Lentulus' stepson, later demanded Cicero's execution as a condition of his joining the Second Triumvirate.

See also
 Lentulus, Roman patrician family.

References

Citations

Bibliography
 Dio Cassius xxxvii. 30, xlvi. 20
 Plutarch, Cicero, 17
 Sallust, Catilina
 Cicero, In Catilinam, iii., iv.; Pro Sulla, 25.
 March, Duane A. (1989), "Cicero and the 'Gang of Five'", Classical World, Volume 82, p.225–234.
 
 

114 BC births
63 BC deaths
1st-century BC executions
1st-century BC Roman consuls
Catilinarians
Sura, Publius
Executed ancient Roman people
People executed by the Roman Republic
Roman patricians
Roman Republican praetors